The second season of Wizards of Waverly Place aired on Disney Channel from September 12, 2008 to August 21, 2009. The season deals with the Russo children, Alex (Selena Gomez), Justin (David Henrie) and Max Russo (Jake T. Austin) continuing to compete to become the leading wizard in their family. Also starring in the series are Maria Canals Barrera and David DeLuise as their parents, Theresa and Jerry, and Jennifer Stone as Alex's best friend, Harper Finkle.

Synopsis
Harper now knows, as of the season’s eighth episode, that Alex, Justin and Max are wizards. Alex and Justin have new love interests  Dean Moriarty (Daniel Samonas), and Juliet Van Heusen (Bridgit Mendler) respectively. The series characters cross over with The Suite Life on Deck and Hannah Montana in part one and two of "Wizards on Deck with Hannah Montana" featuring cast members from The Suite Life on Deck namely, Dylan and Cole Sprouse, Brenda Song, Debby Ryan and Phill Lewis.

Guest stars and recurring cast include: Dan Benson, Bill Chott, Skyler Samuels, Josh Sussman, Daryl Sabara, Cindy Crawford, Fred Willard, Rachel Dratch, Dwayne Johnson, Misty May-Treanor, JD Cullum, Anne Ramsay, Amanda Tepe and Jeff Garlin.

Plot
Alex has another love interest, her classmate Dean Moriarty, and tries to impress him by using magic to make him think she is smart. In another episode, when Alex's nemesis, Gigi Hollingsworth, finds her diary which she draws in, she finds out about Alex's crush on Dean. When Gigi gets trapped, she gets back out and is convinced she hit her head. She tells the school of Alex's crush on Dean and Alex admits what she does in her diary, but denies it was Dean who was the prince in her drawings. He still, however, seems impressed. She later asks him if he will help fix an old car of her father's, which he agrees to do. Dean then enters it in a race once fixing it, but Alex gets mad when her family begin to like Dean and he doesn't spend as much time with her. Alex then transports herself into the car during the race to talk to Dean, who reveals he likes her. Dean asks Alex out, but on a triple date. After Alex eliminates the other couples so that she can be alone with Dean, she realizes he wants to kiss her. On the date, she tries to distract Dean so that he will not, but after he tells her he likes her too much, they kiss. Alex promises she will not abandon him, but then runs off to help her brother. She comes back and they make up. Alex later reveals she doesn't like how badly Dean expresses his feelings. When wizard students stay at the Russos' due to Wiz Tech being closed down, Ronald Longcape Jr. begins to develop feelings for her. Alex feels guilty when she thinks she is falling in love with Ronald. Ronald gets rid of Dean and then transforms into him as to break up with Alex so he can be with her. Ronald takes advantage of her and makes her evil like him and his father so that they can rule. Alex then reveals she is in love with Dean, so he is transformed back. Dean is back and starts calling Alex his girlfriend. Tired of lying to her best friend, she reveals magic to Harper by taking her into space on her birthday. Dean moves away, but Alex tries to continue dating him in his dreams with the use of magic. When he comes to see her, they go out on a date but she realizes they have drifted apart, so she breaks up with him.

When the Van Heusen family open a sandwich shop right next to the Sub Station, they begin to lose business. They send Justin over as a spy, but he meets Juliet Van Heusen, the owner's daughter, and falls for her. Their parents say they cannot date, as their businesses are competing but once learning she is now the good child of the family, Alex changes their parents' minds. Justin discovers Juliet is a vampire, and she tells him she knows he is a wizard. Justin and Juliet get more serious and reveal to each other that they have fallen in love.

Cast
 Selena Gomez as Alex Russo
 David Henrie as Justin Russo
 Jake T. Austin as Max Russo
 Jennifer Stone as Harper Finkle
 Maria Canals Barrera as Theresa Russo
 David DeLuise as Jerry Russo

Episodes

References

External links

2008 American television seasons
2009 American television seasons
Wizards of Waverly Place